Hamirpur Assembly constituency may refer to 
 Hamirpur, Himachal Pradesh Assembly constituency
 Hamirpur, Uttar Pradesh Assembly constituency